Sivieri is a surname. Notable people with the surname include:

Adriana Sivieri (born 1918), Argentine-born Italian film actress
Mário Rino Sivieri (1942–2020), Italian-born Brazilian Roman Catholic bishop